This is a list of diplomatic missions in Jordan. At present, the capital of Amman hosts 71 embassies.  Several other countries have ambassadors accredited from other regional capitals. Honorary consulates are excluded from this listing.

Diplomatic missions in Amman

Embassies

Other missions or delegations 

 (Delegation)

Consulates 
Aqaba

Non-resident embassies accredited to Jordan 

Resident in Abu Dhabi, United Arab Emirates

 
 
 

Resident in Beirut, Lebanon

 
 
 
 

Resident in Cairo, Egypt

 
 
 

 
 

Resident in Damascus, Syria

 
 
 

 
 

Resident in Kuwait City, Kuwait

 
 
 
 
 
 
 

Resident in Riyadh, Saudi Arabia

 
 
 
 
 
 
 
 
 
 
 

Resident elsewhere

 (Athens)
 (Rome)
 (London)
 (Ankara)
 (Ankara) 
 (Ankara)
 (Rome)

Former embassies 
 
  Ethiopia (closed in 1970)
 
  (closed in 1998)

Note

See also 
 Foreign relations of Jordan
 Visa requirements for Jordanian citizens

References

External links 
 Amman Diplomatic List

Foreign relations of Jordan
Diplomatic missions
Jordan